Deneve is a surname of French origin, being a variant of the surname Denefe, which originated as a habitational surname for someone from places called Neffe in Belgium. Notable people with the surname include:

Paul Deneve (born 1961), Belgian businessman
Rita Deneve (1944-2018), Belgian singer
Stéphane Denève (born 1971), French conductor